Isopterygiopsis is a genus of mosses belonging to the family Plagiotheciaceae.

The genus has cosmopolitan distribution.

Species:
 Isopterygiopsis alpicola Hedenäs, 1988 
 Isopterygiopsis muelleriana Iwatsuki, 1970

References

Hypnales
Moss genera